Muspratt is a surname. Notable people with the surname include:
Members of one family:
James Muspratt, a chemical industrialist whose four sons who also worked in the chemical industry:
James Sheridan Muspratt, who moved into academic chemistry
Richard Muspratt, who was also a local politician in Flint, North Wales
Frederic Muspratt
Edmund Knowles Muspratt, also an MP and a local politician
Max Muspratt, son of Edmund Knowles Muspratt
Muspratt Baronets

Other people with the same surname include:
Helen Muspratt, photographer (Ramsey and Muspratt, Cambridge)
Keith Muspratt, pilot in 56 Squadron in World War I
General Sir Sydney Muspratt, Military Secretary to the India Office
Shane Muspratt, North Queensland Cowboys rugby league player
E. J. Muspratt, architect based in Chester
Lesley Margaret Muspratt married Professor A. D. H. Bivar
Julian Muspratt, member of the Australian Olympic water polo team
John Petty Muspratt, British East India Company director
William Muspratt, one of the mutineers aboard 
Paul Muspratt, offshore banker
Ciao Muspratt